Phulia is a Neotropical genus of butterflies in the family Pieridae. The genus was erected by Gottlieb August Wilhelm Herrich-Schäffer in 1867.

Species
Phulia garleppi Field & Herrera, 1977
Phulia nannophyes Dyar, 1913
Phulia nymphula (Blanchard, 1852)
Phulia paranympha Staudinger, 1894

References

Pierini
Pieridae of South America
Pieridae genera
Taxa named by Gottlieb August Wilhelm Herrich-Schäffer